Christos Pantazidis (born 3 November 1995) is a Greek footballer who plays as a defensive midfielder. Born in Kavala, he has played in Aris Akropotamos F.C. Vyrwn Kavalas, Aek Kavalas, Keravnos Keratea F.C.

References

Greek footballers
Association football midfielders
1995 births
Living people
Footballers from Kavala